Bobby Todd (22 June 1904 – 7 September 1980) was a German film actor. He appeared in 34 films between 1926 and 1961.

Selected filmography
 Cruiser Emden (1932)
 The Dream of Butterfly (1939)
 The Original Sin (1948)
 Hello, Fraulein! (1949)
 Dangerous Guests (1949)
 The Man in Search of Himself (1950)
 Desires (1952)
 Jonny Saves Nebrador (1953)
 The Little Town Will Go to Sleep (1954)
 Spring Song (1954)
 The Hunter's Cross (1954)
 The Forest House in Tyrol (1955)
 Love From Paris (1957)
 Rübezahl (1957)
 The Legs of Dolores (1957)
 A Glass of Water (1960)
 The Dead Eyes of London (1961)

References

External links

1904 births
1980 deaths
German male film actors
20th-century German male actors